Kuiba 2 is a 2013 Chinese animated fantasy action adventure film directed by Chuan Wang. It was released on May 31, 2013. The film is part of the Kuiba film series, following Kuiba (2011) and preceding Kuiba 3 (2014).

Plot
Manji and friends land on isles. There they face off against Kuiba's servants.

Voice cast
Jingluo Liu
Xiaoyu Liu
Kai Wang
Lei Ao
Aohui Qu
Zhengjian Guo
Chen Yang

Reception
The film earned  at the Chinese box office.

References

External links

2013 animated films
2013 films
Chinese animated fantasy films
2013 action films
2010s adventure films
2013 fantasy films
Animated action films
Animated adventure films